The Pomoravlje District is one of eight administrative districts of Šumadija and Western Serbia. It expands to the central parts of Serbia. According to the 2011 census results, it has a population of 214,536 inhabitants. The administrative center is the city of Jagodina.

Municipalities

The Pomoravlje District contains 6 municipalities (singular: општина, opština - plural: oпштине, opštine). The following table shows the names of each municipality in the Latin and Cyrillic, the main town (in bold) or village, and the population of each as of 2011:

Demographics

According to the last official census done in 2011, the Pomoravlje District has 214,536 inhabitants. 45.35% of the population lives in the urban areas.

Ethnic groups

Society and culture

Culture
The nineteenth century architecture has been partly preserved in the town. Earlier times are witnessed by the remnants of the edifices such as The House of Hajduk Veljko from the seventeenth century. Particularly interesting is the Old Church of Archangel Michael, the endowment of Miloš Obrenović, built in 1818.

The Jošanica Monastery was built in the late seventeenth century at the time of Despot Đurađ Branković's reign, and is regarded the finest medieval building of this region. In the vicinity of Ćuprija stands the Ravanica Monastery with the Church of Assumption, the endowment of Prince Lazar, built between 1375 and 1377. After the death of Prince Lazar Hrebeljanović in the Battle of Kosovo, his holy relics were safeguarded there all until 1690, when their three-century-long moving together with the Serb people started, as to be finally returned to his endowment today.

The Resava-Manasija monastery is located in the immediate vicinity of Despotovac. The Resava endowment of Despot Stefan Lazarević was built between 1407 and 1418. Over the fifteenth century the famous Resava School carried out its work there, in the framework of several workshops in which major texts of the world heritage were copied and the new ones written. Konstantin the Philosopher, the author of the "Hagiography of Despot Stefan" and the "Book on Letters" which regulated the then current Orthography of Serbian language, carried out his creative work in the Resava Monastery.

Education
There is one faculty located in the Pomoravlje District that is within the University of Kragujevac:
 Faculty of Education in Jagodina

See also
 Administrative divisions of Serbia
 Districts of Serbia

References

Note: All official material made by Government of Serbia is public by law.

External links

 
 Pomoravlje - portal

 
Districts of Šumadija and Western Serbia